Feets, Don't Fail Me Now is the twenty-seventh album by jazz pianist Herbie Hancock. The record was released in February 1979, on the Columbia Records label.

Overview
This was the first of Hancock's albums to discard jazz completely in favor of a more commercial (at the time) disco sound, with vocoder effects and repetitive lyrics. Honey from the Jar, however, is definitely a funk, not  disco, song.  Background vocals were provided by 'The Waters', a family vocal group from Los Angeles.  All LP and CD editions after the first pressing use an alternate 'Disco Mix' version of "Tell Everybody". The original version was included as a bonus track on the disc in the Complete Columbia Albums Collection box set.

Track listing 
 "You Bet Your Love"  – 7:41
 "Trust Me"  – 5:44
 "Ready or Not"  – 6:48
 "Tell Everybody"  – 7:49
 "Honey From the Jar"  – 6:53
 "Knee Deep"  – 5:43

Personnel
 Herbie Hancock – lead and backing vocals, all keyboards
 James Gadson – drums
 Eddie Watkins – bass
 Ray Obiedo – guitar
 Bill Summers – percussion
 Julia Tillman Waters, Maxine Willard Waters, Oren Waters and Luther Waters – backing vocals
 Ray Parker Jr. – guitar and drums on "Ready or Not"
 Coke Escovedo – timbales on "Ready or Not"
 Sheila Escovedo – congas on "Ready or Not"
 James Levi – drums on "Knee Deep" and "Trust Me"
 Freddie Washington – bass on "Knee Deep"
 Wah Wah Watson – guitar on "Knee Deep"
 Bennie Maupin – soprano saxophone on "Knee Deep"

Additional personnel
 Produced by – David Rubinson & Friends Inc. and Herbie Hancock
 Associate producer – Jeffrey Cohen
 Engineers – Fred Catero and David Rubinson
 Assistant engineers – Chris Minto, Leslie Ann Jones, Ken Kassie and Cheryl Ward
 Mastering engineer – Phil Brown
 Keyboard and Vocoder engineer – Bryan Bell

References

External links
 http://www.discogs.com/release/385157

1979 albums
Herbie Hancock albums
Columbia Records albums
Albums produced by Dave Rubinson